The Jaredites are one of four peoples (along with the Nephites, Lamanites, and Mulekites) that the Latter-day Saints believe settled in ancient America.

The Book of Mormon (mainly its Book of Ether) describes the Jaredites as the descendants of Jared and his brother, who lived at the time of the Tower of Babel. According to the Book of Mormon, they fled across the ocean on unique barges and established an ancient civilization in America. The Book of Ether's  mention of a "narrow neck of land" has led some to conclude that the civilization likely spanned from the Midwest to the Eastern United States such as New York, where fossils of ancient mammoths have now been discovered in abundance, and many Native American accounts describe Niagara as the narrow strip of land that literally translates to "the neck".  Others argue for a location still north of but nearer to the "necks of land" in Central America or Mexico. 

Mainstream archaeology has found no evidence of the existence of Jaredites or any of the other three groups.

Book of Ether
According to the Book of Mormon, the Jaredites are the descendants of Jared, his brother, their immediate family, and their friends.  (Joseph Smith later identified the brother of Jared as Mahonri Moriancumer.)  At the time of the Tower of Babel, when the tongues of all nations were confounded, the Lord acceded to the desires of Jared, and his people's language was not confounded. The people were also granted a land of promise.

The Lord guided the people through the wilderness and were eventually directed to cross the sea in "barges". The vessels were sealed and watertight and able to be swamped by waves without sinking. Air was obtained from outside the vessels, as needed. They also brought with them animals and food. The recorded length of the miraculous trip was 344 days. Among other things they carried in their voyage were honeybees, which, in the language of the Jaredites were called "deseret". Additionally, they brought seeds. 

Ether is the last in the royal line that began with one of the sons of Jared. From the time of the first king to the destruction of the Jaredites, there were only occasional periods of peace and prosperity. The times of peace were interrupted by intrigue over the throne, civil war, and the accession of wicked kings. The history of the Jaredites confirmed the fears of Jared and his brother that a monarchy would lead to evil.

The Book of Mormon claims that the Jaredites grew to become a civilization that exceeded two million people just before its destruction. They finally destroyed themselves about the time Lehi and the other refugees from Jerusalem arrived in America. A prophecy of Ether was fulfilled: the last Jaredite king, Coriantumr, lived to see both the total destruction of his entire house, the scattering of the remaining Jaredites, and the arrival of another people to inherit the land.

Other references in Book of Mormon
Outside the Book of Ether, the Book of Mormon relates that Coriantumr was found by the Mulekites. The Nephites later encountered the Mulekites and taught them the Nephite language. The Mulekites told them that Coriantumr had died some nine months after he had come to live with them. The Nephite prophet King Mosiah I was able to translate a large stone with engravings that gave an account of Coriantumr. Another record on twenty-four plates, discovered by the people of King Limhi, was translated by the Nephite King Mosiah II. An abridged account of the Jaredite records was later included by Moroni, as the Book of Ether, in the Book of Mormon.

Geography

The ocean crossed is not specified in the Book of Mormon. Hugh Nibley's There were Jaredites and The World of the Jaredites argue for the Pacific Ocean, but Milton R. Hunter argues for the Atlantic Ocean.

The location of the Jaredite civilization is also not specified in the Book of Mormon except that it was north of a narrow neck of land in what was called the "Land Northward" by the Nephites.  The New World location of the Jaredites and Nephites is a subject of disagreement among Mormons. Joseph Smith indicated that the Jaredites arrived in "the lake country of America" and that "the Nephites... lived about the narrow neck of land, which now embraces Central America, with all the cities that can be found."

Proposed relations

Descendants of Ham
Some early Latter Day Saints, including Apostle Parley P. Pratt believed the Jaredites were descendants of Ham, based on the group's origins near the Tower of Babel, and initial migration into the Valley of Nimrod, an area associated with the descendants of Ham.

Olmecs
Some Mormon apologists have argued for substantial parallels between the Jaredites and the Olmecs. For example, one scholar asserted that writings an ancient Native American historian, Fernando de Alva Cortés Ixtlilxochitl, wrote about a group of people who came from the great tower to Mesoamerica. Ixtlilxochitl wrote that the people lived in an area in the northern parts of the land, along the Gulf Coast of Mexico. Other LDS researchers, such as W. Vincent Coon, point to native legends and suggest that the earliest immigrants to Central America migrated by land and boat from "northern America". Phyllis Carol Olive compares Jaredite civilization to ancient cultures of the Great Lakes region.

References

Sources

External links
Jaredite chronology

Book of Mormon peoples
Book of Mormon words and phrases
Mormonism and Native Americans